Plauditus dubius is a species of small minnow mayfly in the family Baetidae. It is found in all of Canada, the northern, southeastern United States, and Alaska.

References

External links

 

Mayflies
Articles created by Qbugbot
Insects described in 1862